Mystery Writers of America (MWA) is an organization of mystery and crime writers, based in New York City.

The organization was founded in 1945 by Clayton Rawson, Anthony Boucher, Lawrence Treat, and Brett Halliday.

It presents the Edgar Award, a small bust of Edgar Allan Poe, to mystery or crime writers every year.  It presents the Raven Award to non-writers, who contribute to the mystery genre. The category of Best Juvenile Mystery is also part of the Edgar Award, with such notable recipients as Barbara Brooks Wallace having won the honor twice, for The Twin in the Tavern in 1994 and Sparrows in the Scullery in 1998, and Tony Abbott for his novel The Postcard, which received critical accolades in 2009.

Grand Master Award
The Grand Master Award is the highest honor bestowed by the Mystery Writers of America. It recognizes lifetime achievement and consistent quality.  (The award was presented irregularly up to 1978; from 1979 to 2008, it was given to one writer each year. Since 2009, as many as three authors have been honored annually.)

In 2018, the Mystery Writers of America announced that it would honor best-selling author and former prosecutor Linda Fairstein with one of its Grand Master Awards for literary achievement. But two days after controversy erupted in connection with her alleged role in the Central Park jogger case, the organization withdrew the honor.

Raven Award

The Raven Awards are recorded in the Edgars Database of the Mystery Writers of America.

See also
 The Top 100 Mystery Novels of All Time, selected by active MWA members in 1995
 Crime Writers' Association
 Crime Writers of Canada
 Mystery Writers of Japan
 Swedish Crime Writers' Academy

References

External links

 
Mystery and detective fiction awards
American writers' organizations
1945 establishments in the United States
Arts organizations established in 1945
Arts organizations based in New York City